Free Food for Millionaires is a 2007 novel by Korean American writer Min Jin Lee. It was named one of the Top 10 Novels of the Year by The Times, a notable novel by the San Francisco Chronicle, a New York Times Editor's Choice, and was a selection for the Wall Street Journal Juggler Book Club.

The book is about a young Korean-American woman who graduates from college and is determined to find a place in New York high society, despite having no money or job.

References

External links
Min Jin Lee's official website
New York Times review
Entertainment Weekly review

2007 American novels
2007 debut novels